National Highway 10 (NH 10) (old NH 31A) is a national highway in North East India that connects Indo/Bangladesh border via Siliguri to Gangtok. It passes through the Indian states of West Bengal and Sikkim.

Route

NH10 starts from Indo/Bangladesh border connecting Phulbari, Siliguri,  Sevoke, Kalijhora, Rambi Bazar, Teesta Bazaar, Kalimpong, Melli in West Bengal and Rangpo, Majitar, Singtam, Ranipool and terminating at Gangtok in the State of Sikkim. Atal Setu Bridge, the longest roadway bridge of sikkim is also the part of National Highway 10 which lies on the border of West Bengal's Kalimpong district and Sikkim's Pakyong District at the town of Rangpo.

Junctions  

  Terminal at Sevoke.
  Terminal at Ranipool.
  Terminal near Gangtok.
  Terminal at Gangtok.
  Terminal at Singtam.
  Terminal at Melli.

See also
 List of National Highways in India
 List of National Highways in India by state
 National Highways Development Project
 National Highway 717A

References

External links
 NH 10 on OpenStreetMap

Transport in Siliguri
National Highways in Sikkim
National Highways in West Bengal
National highways in India
Transport in Gangtok